The term CHARM Bank refers to an acronym popularly used in the 1990s to describe the top boutique investment banks of the decade.

The five banks' whose initials comprise the acronym CHARM were: Cowen & Co., Hambrecht & Quist, Alex. Brown, Robertson Stephens and Montgomery Securities.  All of these banks were absorbed by larger commercial or bulge bracket investment banks by the end of the decade, thus losing their independence as advisers and underwriters.  They were known in particular for the financial services they provided to the decade's high growth industries: telecommunications, healthcare, internet, software, and hardware.

Cowen & Co. was purchased by the French universal bank Société Générale in 1998, becoming SG Cowen, and was later spun off in an IPO as in independent entity known today as Cowen Group in 2006.

Hambrecht & Quist was acquired by Chase Manhattan Bank in 1999 and was named Chase Securities West and is now a part of JP Morgan Chase following the merger of Chase Manhattan Bank with J.P. Morgan & Co. in 2000.

Alex. Brown was acquired by Bankers Trust in 1997, which was subsequently acquired by Deutsche Bank in 1999.

Robertson Stephens was acquired by BankAmerica, the holding company owning Bank of America and its subsidiaries, in 1997.  BankAmemerica subsequently divested Robertson Stephens to BankBoston in 1998, falling under FleetBoston Financial in 1998 following the merger of Fleet Financial with BankBoston.  Failing to find a buyer for Robertson Stephens, FleetBoston Financial elected to liquidate its holding in 2002.

Montgomery Securities was acquired by NationsBank Corporation in 1997, which was subsequently acquired by BankAmerica, later in 1997.

Investment banks